Antoine Sublet (1821–1897) was a French painter.

Biography

Early life
Benoît-Antoine Sublet was born in 1821 in Lyon. He was ordained as a Roman Catholic priest, and was particularly close to the Carthusian Order.

Career

He painted frescoes inside the Belley Cathedral and the Hôtel-Dieu de Lyon. Additionally, he painted the vault inside the Église Saint-Théodore in Marseille from 1860 to 1863.

While he was living in Rome, Italy, he worked as a copyist for painter Charles Soulacroix (1825–1899). His painting entitled The Apparition of the Sacred Heart to Marguerite-marie Alacoque is displayed inside the Church of Saint-Bruno des Chartreux in Lyon.

Death
He died in 1897 in Paris.

References

1821 births
1897 deaths
Artists from Lyon
Catholic painters
19th-century French Roman Catholic priests
19th-century French painters
Clergy from Lyon